Hydrotaea ignava is a species of house flies, etc. in the family Muscidae. It is found in Europe.

References

External links

 

Muscidae
Muscomorph flies of Europe
Insects described in 1780
Taxa named by Moses Harris
Articles created by Qbugbot